Elizabeth Baur (December 1, 1947 – September 30, 2017) was an American actress. She is perhaps best known for her roles as Teresa O'Brien on the CBS western series Lancer, and as Officer Fran Belding on NBC's crime drama series Ironside.

Early life
Baur was born in Los Angeles. Juanita Gless, her great-grandmother, was an early settler of California who came from the Basque region of France. Actress Sharon Gless is Baur's first cousin.

Her father, Jack Baur, was a veteran casting director at 20th Century Fox, and did not want his daughter in the industry.

She attended Immaculate Heart High School in Los Angeles.

Education 
Baur attended Los Angeles Valley College "for a year and three-quarters." Baur left college to join a 20th Century Fox program for training actors.

Career 
After actress Barbara Anderson left NBC's Ironside after four seasons, Baur was hired as her replacement. Baur told a reporter in 1972: "They interviewed 100 girls for this role. Then they had 14 of us come in and read for the part. Finally they gave seven of us screen tests. I was really surprised they chose me." Two years later, she said, "Officer Fran Belding is the hardest part I've ever had to play, because she's so straight, so normal."

Baur and Anderson would both appear in the 1993 TV reunion movie The Return of Ironside. Baur reprised her role of Fran Belding alongside her former co-stars Raymond Burr, Don Galloway and Don Mitchell.

Personal life 
Baur's first marriage was to Eugene Worton in 1976, and they had one daughter together, producer Lesley Worton, before they divorced in 1985. Her second marriage was to Steven Springer, in 1989. 

Baur died on September 30, 2017, after a lengthy illness at the age of 69.

Filmography

References

External links

1947 births
2017 deaths
20th-century American actresses
Actresses from Los Angeles
American film actresses
American television actresses
Alumni of Immaculate Heart High School, Los Angeles
21st-century American women